The National Parks is an American folk/pop band from Provo, Utah. The 4-member band consists of Brady Parks from Denver, Colorado (guitar and lead vocals), Sydney Macfarlane from Kaysville, Utah (keyboards and vocals), Cam Brannelly from Draper, Utah (drums), and Megan Taylor Parks from Draper, Utah (fiddle and vocals).

Formed in 2013, with March 15, 2013 marking the band's first public performance, their debut album, Young, won them a devoted following, climbing to #13 on the iTunes singer/songwriter chart upon its release. Since that time, the band has released two additional studio albums and has sold out shows in New York City, Washington, D.C., and Los Angeles.

History

2012–2014: Formation and Young 
The National Parks began as the brainchild of frontman Brady Parks. While studying Advertising Design at Brigham Young University in Provo, Utah, Parks began writing a collection of acoustic-heavy narrative folk tunes. After forming a group called Brady Parks and the IndiAnns for a battle of the bands at Velour Live Music Gallery, this group went on to record an album called The Mossy Mountain, which was released to iTunes and Spotify on February 24, 2012.

The success of this first release prompted them to launch a successful Kickstarter campaign for the album that would eventually become Young.

After several lineup changes, the group rebranded and started fresh as The National Parks, with March 15, 2013 marking the band's first public performance. This public performance was hyped by a guerrilla marketing campaign. Hundreds of flyers were circulated around Provo, UT that offered little information other than the line, “Who are The National Parks?” A link to their website led to a video containing commentary from popular local bands and music venue owners who each explained that The National Parks were a band to be excited about.

The group released Young in 2013. The album was recorded at June Audio with producer Scott Wiley and climbed to #13 on the iTunes singer/songwriter chart.  In January 2014 the band released the standalone single "As We Ran," which was written for the documentary film Love in the Tetons. The group donated the first month of proceeds from the single to the National Parks Conservation Association. The National Parks began touring around the release of Young. The online success of the album and "As We Ran" helped them find growing crowds around Utah as well as in Seattle, Los Angeles, Chicago, and New York City.

2015–2016: International Attention and Until I Live 
International attention came to the band with the premiere of "Helsinki" on NPR's All Songs Considered in January 2015.

The band again worked with Scott Wiley on their second album, Until I Live, which was independently released September 2015 and climbed to #52 on the iTunes Pop Chart and #5 on Billboard's Top Heatseekers Chart for the Mountain Region. In March 2016, the band was named Utah's "Band of the Year" by Salt Lake City Weekly magazine. The following month, "Monsters of the North" - the lead single from Until I Live - was announced as winner of the International Songwriting Competition for all unsigned artists.

As part of the centennial of the National Park Service, The National Parks performed at an event with celebrated writer Terry Tempest Williams for the National Parks Conservation Association in June 2016. Since their sophomore release, the band has been favorably compared to a wide variety of acts including Foster the People, The Civil Wars, and Mumford & Sons,  In addition to their own headlining shows, The National Parks has played with acts such as Andy Grammer, Peter Bjorn and John, The Lone Bellow, LeAnn Rimes, and The Moth & The Flame and performed at SXSW, Canadian Music Week, School Night at Bardot's, Musikfest, Snowmass Mammoth Fest, and Make Music Pasadena.

2017–2020: Places 
In August 2017, The National Parks performed on JBTV in Chicago, announcing that their third album, Places, would be released September 15, 2017. The music video for the lead single, "Places," debuted through Impose Magazine on June 16, 2017. More pop infused than previous releases, Places features folk-pop song craft on acoustic guitar and violin, backed by electronic textures.

On September 8, 2017, the band launched the Places Tour. The tour concluded October 27, 2017 and took the band through 19 different cities across the United States.

On March 22, 2019, The National Parks released a new single, "I Can Feel It".

2020–2023: Wildflower 
On June 19, 2020, The National Parks released a new album, "Wildflower". To accommodate social distancing and work around venue closures due to the COVID-19 pandemic, they announced a more intimate tour, called "Campfire Tour", with 12 stops to promote their new album.

2023-Present: 8th Wonder 

On March 3rd, 2023, The National Parks released the album "8th Wonder".

References

Rock music groups from Utah
2013 establishments in Utah
Musical groups established in 2013
Alternative rock groups from Utah
Indie rock musical groups from Utah
Musical quintets